Sachatamia punctulata is a species of frog in the family Centrolenidae. It is endemic to the Cordillera Central, Colombia, in the departments of Antioquia, Caldas, and Tolima. It is restricted to forest remnants that are surrounded by inhospitable agricultural habitat matrix. As a result, it is threatened by habitat loss and fragmentation.

References

Sachatamia
Amphibians of the Andes
Amphibians of Colombia
Endemic fauna of Colombia
Taxa named by John Douglas Lynch
Amphibians described in 1995
Taxonomy articles created by Polbot